Phyllodactylus is a genus of geckos distributed in South America and Central America, and as far north as the southern United States. They are commonly known as "leaf-toed geckos" in their native range, and otherwise as American leaf-toed geckos to distinguish them from unrelated genera with similar feet.

Species
Phyllodactylus contains these species:

Phyllodactylus andysabini Arteaga, Bustamante, Vieira, Tapia & Guayasamin, 2019 – Andy Sabin's leaf-toed gecko, Wolf Volcano leaf-toed gecko
Phyllodactylus angustidigitus Dixon & Huey, 1970 – narrow leaf-toed gecko
Phyllodactylus apricus Dixon, 1966 – Las Animas Island gecko
Phyllodactylus barringtonensis Van Denburgh, 1912 – Barrington leaf-toed gecko
Phyllodactylus baurii Garman, 1892 – Baur's leaf-toed gecko
Phyllodactylus benedettii Ramírez-Reyes & Flores-Villela, 2018
Phyllodactylus bordai Taylor, 1942 – Guerreran leaf-toed gecko
Phyllodactylus bugastrolepis Dixon, 1966 – Catalina Island leaf-toed gecko
Phyllodactylus cleofasensis Ramírez-Reyes, Barraza-Soltero, Nolasco-Luna, Flores-Villela & Escobedo-Galván, 2021
Phyllodactylus clinatus Dixon & Huey, 1970 – Cerro Illescas gecko
Phyllodactylus coronatus Dixon, 1966 – Coronado Island leaf-toed gecko
Phyllodactylus darwini Taylor, 1942 – Darwin's leaf-toed gecko
Phyllodactylus davisi Dixon, 1964 – Davis's leaf-toed gecko
Phyllodactylus delcampoi Mosauer, 1936 – Del Campo's leaf-toed gecko
Phyllodactylus delsolari Venegas, Townsend, Koch & Böhme, 2008
Phyllodactylus dixoni Rivero-Blanco & Lancini, 1968 – Dixon's leaf-toed gecko
Phyllodactylus duellmani Dixon, 1960 – Duellman's pigmy leaf-toed gecko
Phyllodactylus duncanensis Van Denburgh, 1912
Phyllodactylus galapagensis W. Peters, 1869 – Galapagos leaf-toed gecko
Phyllodactylus gerrhopygus (Wiegmann, 1834) – South American leaf-toed gecko
Phyllodactylus gilberti Heller, 1903 – Gilbert's leaf-toed gecko
Phyllodactylus gorii Lanza, 1973 - Española leaf-toed gecko
Phyllodactylus hispaniolae Schwartz, 1979 – Dominican leaf-toed gecko
Phyllodactylus homolepidurus H.M. Smith, 1935 – Sonoran leaf-toed gecko
Phyllodactylus inaequalis Cope, 1876 – Peru leaf-toed gecko
Phyllodactylus insularis Dixon, 1960 – Belize leaf-toed gecko
Phyllodactylus interandinus Dixon & Huey, 1970 – Andes leaf-toed gecko
Phyllodactylus johnwrighti Dixon & Huey, 1970 – Rio Huancabamba leaf-toed gecko
Phyllodactylus julieni Cope, 1885 – Aruba leaf-toed gecko
Phyllodactylus kofordi Dixon & Huey, 1970 – coastal leaf-toed gecko
Phyllodactylus kropotkini Ramírez-Reyes & Flores-Villela, 2018
Phyllodactylus lanei H.M. Smith, 1935 – Lane's leaf-toed gecko
Phyllodactylus leei Cope, 1889 – San Cristóbal Island leaf-toed gecko, Chatham leaf-toed gecko
Phyllodactylus leoni Torres-Carvajal, Carvajal-Campos, Barnes, Nicholls & Pozo-Andrade, 2013
Phyllodactylus lepidopygus (Tschudi, 1845) – western leaf-toed gecko
Phyllodactylus magister Noble, 1924 – Noble's leaf-toed gecko
Phyllodactylus magnus Taylor, 1942
Phyllodactylus maresi Lanza, 1973 – Mares's leaf-toed gecko
Phyllodactylus martini Lidth de Jeude, 1887 – Dutch leaf-toed gecko
Phyllodactylus microphyllus Cope, 1876 – central leaf-toed gecko
Phyllodactylus muralis Taylor, 1940 – Oaxacan leaf-toed gecko
Phyllodactylus nocticolus Dixon, 1964 – peninsula leaf-toed gecko
Phyllodactylus nolascoensis Dixon, 1964 – Nolasco leaf-toed gecko
Phyllodactylus pachamama Koch, Flecks, Venegas, Bialke, Valverde & Rödder, 2016
Phyllodactylus palmeus Dixon, 1968 – Honduras leaf-toed gecko
Phyllodactylus papenfussi Murphy, Blair & Méndez-de la Cruz, 2009
Phyllodactylus paralepis McCranie & Hedges, 2013
Phyllodactylus partidus Dixon, 1966 – Pardita Norte leaf-toed gecko
Phyllodactylus paucituberculatus Dixon, 1960 – Rio Marquez Valley gecko
Phyllodactylus pulcher Gray, 1830 – Barbados leaf-toed gecko
Phyllodactylus pumilus Dixon & Huey, 1970
Phyllodactylus reissii W. Peters, 1862 – Peters's leaf-toed gecko
Phyllodactylus rutteni Hummelinck, 1940 – Venezuela leaf-toed gecko
Phyllodactylus santacruzensis Dixon, 1966 – Santa Cruz leaf-toed gecko
Phyllodactylus saxatilis Dixon, 1964 
Phyllodactylus sentosus Dixon & Huey, 1970 – Lima leaf-toed gecko
Phyllodactylus simpsoni Arteaga, Bustamante, Vieira, Tapia & Guayasamin, 2019 – Simpson's leaf-toed gecko, Western Galápagos leaf-toed gecko
Phyllodactylus sommeri Schwartz, 1979 – Haiti leaf-toed gecko
Phyllodactylus thompsoni Venegas, Townsend, Koch & Böhme, 2008
Phyllodactylus transversalis Huey, 1975 – Colombian leaf-toed gecko
Phyllodactylus tuberculosus Wiegmann, 1834 – yellowbelly gecko
Phyllodactylus unctus (Cope, 1864) – San Lucan gecko
Phyllodactylus ventralis O'Shaughnessy, 1875
Phyllodactylus wirshingi Kerster & H.M. Smith, 1955 – Puerto Rican leaf-toed gecko
Phyllodactylus xanti Cope, 1863 – leaf-toed gecko, peninsular leaf-toed gecko

Nota bene: A binomial authority in parentheses indicates that the species was originally described in a genus other than Phyllodactylus.

References

Further reading
Boulenger GA (1885). Catalogue of the Lizards in the British Museum (Natural History). Second Edition. Volume I. Gekkonidæ ... London: Trustees of the British Museum (Natural History). (Taylor and Francis, printers). xii + 436 pp. + Plates I-XXXII. (Genus Phyllodactylus, p. 76).
Gray JE (1828). Spicilegia Zoologica: or Original Figures and Short Systematic Description of New and Unfigured Animals. London: Treuttel, Wurtz and Wood. (Phyllodactylus, new genus, p. 3).

 
Lizard genera
Taxa named by John Edward Gray